The Max-Planck-Institute for Human Development (Max-Planck-Institut für Bildungsforschung) is an internationally renowned social science research organization. Located in Berlin, it was initiated in 1961 and officially began operations in 1963 under the name Institute for Educational Research in the Max Planck Society, before receiving its current name in 1971. Its co-founder and first director was Hellmut Becker. The institute is part of the Human Sciences Section of the Max Planck Society.

Research activities focus on the development and education of humans, with an emphasis on basic research. The concept of education is defined broadly, embracing both formal educational processes as well as developmental processes from childhood to old age. Currently, around 350 employees contribute to interdisciplinary research in four research centers, a Lise Meitner Group and three research groups.

Research Centers

 Center for Adaptive Rationality (Director: Ralph Hertwig)
 Center for Lifespan Psychology (Managing Director: Ulman Lindenberger)
 Research Center History of Emotions (Director: Ute Frevert)
Center for Humans and Machines (Director: Iyad Rahwan)

Lise Meitner Group

 Lise Meitner Group for Environmental Neuroscience (Head: Simone Kühn)

Research Groups

 Max Planck Research Group iSearch | Information Search, Ecological and Active Learning Research with Children (Head: Azzurra Ruggeri)
 Max Planck Research Group Neural and Computational Basis of Learning, Memory and Decision Making (Head: Nicolas Schuck)
 Max Planck Research Group Naturalistic Social Cognition (Head: Annie E. Wertz)

In addition, there are two more research centers:

 The Harding Center for Risk Literacy was opened in April 2009. Motivating its research is the vision of enlightened individuals who are equipped to deal with risks in the modern technological world in an informed way. The director of the Harding Center is Gerd Gigerenzer.
The Max Planck UCL Centre for Computational Psychiatry and Ageing Research took up its work in April 2014. It is the result of the existing collaboration between the Max Planck Society and University College London that began in 2011. The Centre is dedicated to studying the causes of psychiatric disorders as well as the causes of individual differences in cognitive development, with an emphasis on adulthood and old age. Two Co-Directors form the Leading Team of the Centre: Ray Dolan for University College London and Ulman Lindenberger for the Max Planck Society.

The Research Center for Adaptive Behavior and Cognition (Director: Gerd Gigerenzer) ended its activities in 2017. 

The Research Center of Educational Research (Director: Jürgen Baumert) ended its activities in 2010. Its best-known projects were the TIMS study (TIMSS) and the PISA study, whose results received wide attention by both the mass media and politicians.

The institute is located in Wilmersdorf, a neighbourhood in the southwest of Berlin, immediately bordering on the neighborhood of Dahlem, and is therefore considered part of Dahlem's traditional science district. This is home to a number of scientific organizations such as the Free University Berlin, which works together with the institute.

The founding director of the Max Planck Institute for Human Development was Hellmut Becker, subsequently joined by Dietrich Goldschmidt (1963) and Saul B. Robinsohn (1964) as the first generation of directors. They were followed by directors Wolfgang Edelstein (1973), Peter M. Roeder (1973) and Friedrich Edding (director from 1973), Paul B. Baltes (1980), Karl Ulrich Mayer (1983), Jürgen Baumert (1996), Gerd Gigerenzer (1997), Ulman Lindenberger (2003), Ute Frevert (2008), Ralph Hertwig (2012) and Iyad Rahwan (2019).

See also 
 List of universities, colleges, and research institutions in Berlin

External links 
 Publications of the Max Planck Institute for Human Development
 Official site MPI-Berlin
 Harding Center for Risk Literacy 
 Max Planck UCL Centre for Computational Psychiatry and Ageing Research
 Twitter Channel of the Max Planck Institute for Human Development
 YouTube Channel of the Max Planck Institute for Human Development

Human Development
Social science institutes
Universities and colleges in Berlin